Paradiancistrus christmasensis, commonly known as the Christmas viviparous brotula, is a species of viviparous brotula native to the waters around Christmas Island and the south-eastern Indian Ocean.  This species grows to a length of  SL.

References
 

Bythitidae
Fish described in 2011